Basilissopsis watsoni is a species of minute sea snail, a marine gastropod mollusc in the family Seguenziidae.

Description
The height of the nacreous shell attains 2 mm. The shell has labral sinuses.

Distribution
This species occurs in the Atlantic Ocean off the Azores.

References

External links
  Serge GOFAS, Ángel A. LUQUE, Joan Daniel OLIVER,José TEMPLADO & Alberto SERRA (2021) - The Mollusca of Galicia Bank (NE Atlantic Ocean); European Journal of Taxonomy 785: 1–114

watsoni
Gastropods described in 1897